One of the modern systems of plant taxonomy, the Dahlgren system was published by monocot specialist Rolf Dahlgren in 1975 and revised in 1977, and  1980. However, he is best known for his two treatises on monocotyledons in 1982  and revised in 1985. His wife Gertrud Dahlgren continued the work after his death.

Dahlgren ranked the dicotyledons and monocotyledons as subclasses of the class of flowering plants (angiosperms) and further divided them into superorders. Originally (1975) he used the suffix -anae, as did Cronquist, to designate these, but in 1980 changed this to -florae in accordance with Thorne. In the 1989 revision, published by his wife, the alternate names Magnoliidae and Liliidae were dropped in favour of Dicotyledon and Monocotyledon, and  the suffix -florae reverted to -anae (e.g. Alismatanae for Alismatiflorae).

Reveal provides an extensive listing of Dahlgren's classification. (Note the synonyms, both nomenclatural and taxonomic, for each name in the system.)

1980 system

Summary
 Class Magnoliopsida (flowering plants (Angiospermae or Magnoliophyta)
 Subclass Magnoliidae (dicotyledons) 24 superorders
 Superorder Magnoliiflorae
 Superorder Nymphaeiflorae 
 Superorder Ranunculiflorae
 Superorder Caryophylliflorae
 Superorder Polygoniflorae
 Superorder Malviflorae
 Superorder Violiflorae
 Superorder Theiflorae
 Superorder Primuliflorae
 Superorder Rosiflorae
 Superorder Podostemiflorae
 Superorder Fabiflorae
 Superorder Proteiflorae
 Superorder Myrtiflorae
 Superorder Rutiflorae
 Superorder Santaliflorae
 Superorder Balanophoriflorae
 Superorder Araliiflorae
 Superorder Asteriflorae
 Superorder Solaniflorae
 Superorder Corniflorae
 Superorder Loasiflorae
 Superorder Gentianiflorae
 Superorder Lamiiflorae
 Subclass Liliidae (monocotyledons) 7 superorders
 Superorder Alismatiflorae
 Superorder Triuridiflorae
 Superorder Ariflorae
 Superorder Liliiflorae
 Superorder Zingiberiflorae
 Superorder Commeliniflorae
 Superorder Areciflorae

Magnoliidae (dicotyledons) 

 Subclass Magnoliiflorae
 Superorder Magnolianae
 Order Annonales
 Family Annonaceae
 Family Myristicaceae
 Family Eupomatiaceae
 Family Canellaceae
 Family Austrobaileyaceae
 Order Aristolochiales
 Family Aristolochiaceae
 Order Rafflesiales
 Family Rafflesiaceae
 Family Hydnoraceae
 Order Magnoliales
 Family Degeneriaceae
 Family Himantandraceae
 Family Magnoliaceae
 Order Lactoridales
 Family Lactoridaceae
 Order Winterales
 Family Winteraceae
 Order Chloranthales
 Family Chloranthaceae
 Order Illiciales
 Family Illiciaceae
 Family Schisandraceae
 Order Laurales
 Family Amborellaceae
 Family Trimeniaceae
 Family Monimiaceae
 Family Gomortegaceae
 Family Calycanthaceae
 Family Lauraceae
 Order Nelumbonales
 Family Nelumbonaceae
 Superorder Nymphaeiflorae
 Order Piperales
 Family Saururaceae
 Family Piperaceae
 Order Nymphaeales
 Family Cabombaceae
 Family Nymphaeaceae
 Family Ceratophyllaceae
 Superorder Ranunculiflorae
 Order Ranunculales
 Family Lardizabalaceae
 Family Sargentodoxaceae
 Family Menispermaceae
 Family Kingdoniaceae
 Family Circaeasteraceae
 Family Ranunculaceae
 Family Hydrastidaceae
 Family Berberidaceae
 Order Papaverales
 Family Papaveraceae
 Family Fumariaceae
 Superorder Caryophylliflorae
 Order Caryophyllales
 Family Molluginaceae
 Family Caryophyllaceae
 Family Phytolaccaceae
 Family Achatocarpaceae
 Family Agdestidaceae
 Family Basellaceae
 Family Portulacaceae
 Family Stegnospermataceae
 Family Nyctaginaceae
 Family Aizoaceae
 Family Halophytaceae
 Family Cactaceae
 Family Didiereaceae
 Family Hectorellaceae
 Family Chenopodiaceae
 Family Amaranthaceae
 Superorder Polygoniflorae
 Order Polygonales
 Family Polygonaceae
 Superorder Malviflorae
 Order Malvales
 Family Sterculiaceae
 Family Plagiopteraceae
 Family Bixaceae
 Family Cochlospermaceae
 Family Cistaceae
 Family Sphaerosepalaceae
 Family Sarcolaenaceae
 Family Huaceae
 Family Tiliaceae
 Family Dipterocarpaceae
 Family Bombacaceae
 Family Malvaceae
 Order Urticales
 Family Ulmaceae
 Family Moraceae
 Family Cecropiaceae
 Family Barbeyaceae
 Family Cannabaceae
 Family Urticaceae
 Order Euphorbiales
 Family Euphorbiaceae
 Family Simmondsiaceae
 Family Pandaceae
 Family Aextoxicaceae
 Family Dichapetalaceae
 Order Plumbaginales
 Family Plumbaginaceae
 Family Limoniaceae
 Order Thymelaeales
 Family Gonystylaceae
 Family Thymelaeaceae
 Order Rhamnales
 Family Rhamnaceae
 Superorder Violiflorae
 Order Violales
 Family Flacourtiaceae
 Family Berberidopsidaceae
 Family Aphloiaceae
 Family Physenaceae
 Family Passifloraceae
 Family Dipentodontaceae
 Family Peridiscaceae
 Family Scyphostegiaceae
 Family Violaceae
 Family Turneraceae
 Family Malesherbiaceae
 Family Caricaceae
 Order Cucurbitales
 Family Achariaceae
 Family Cucurbitaceae
 Family Begoniaceae
 Family Datiscaceae
 Order Salicales
 Family Salicaceae
 Order Tamaricales
 Family Tamaricaceae
 Family Frankeniaceae
 Order Capparales
 Family Capparaceae
 Family Brassicaceae
 Family Tovariaceae
 Family Resedaceae
 Family Gyrostemonaceae
 Family Bataceae
 Family Moringaceae
 Order Tropaeolales
 Family Tropaeolaceae
 Family Limnanthaceae
 Order Salvadorales
 Family Salvadoraceae
Superorder Theiflorae
 Order Dilleniales
 Family Dilleniaceae
 Order Paeoniales
 Family Glaucidiaceae
 Family Paeoniaceae
 Order Theales
 Family Stachyuraceae
 Family Pentaphylacaceae
 Family Marcgraviaceae
 Family Quiinaceae
 Family Ancistrocladaceae
 Family Dioncophyllaceae
 Family Nepenthaceae
 Family Medusagynaceae
 Family Caryocaraceae
 Family Strasburgeriaceae
 Family Ochnaceae
 Family Chrysobalanaceae
 Family Oncothecaceae
 Family Scytopetalaceae
 Family Theaceae
 Family Bonnetiaceae
 Family Clusiaceae
 Family Elatinaceae
 Order Lecythidales
 Family Lecythidaceae
 Superorder Primuliflorae
 Order Primulales
 Family Myrsinaceae
 Family Aegicerataceae
 Family Theophrastaceae
 Family Primulaceae
 Family Coridaceae
 Order Ebenales
 Family Sapotaceae
 Family Styracaceae
 Family Lissocarpaceae
 Family Ebenaceae
 Superorder Rosiflorae
 Order Trochodendrales
 Family Trochodendraceae
 Family Tetracentraceae
 Order Cercidiphyllales
 Family Cercidiphyllaceae
 Family Eupteleaceae
 Order Hamamelidales
 Family Hamamelidaceae
 Family Platanaceae
 Family Myrothamnaceae
 Order Balanopales
 Family Balanopaceae
 Order Fagales
 Family Nothofagaceae
 Family Fagaceae
 Family Corylaceae
 Family Betulaceae
 Order Juglandales
 Family Rhoipteleaceae
 Family Juglandaceae
 Order Myricales
 Family Myricaceae
 Order Casuarinales
 Family Casuarinaceae
 Order Buxales
 Family Buxaceae
 Family Daphniphyllaceae
 Family Didymelaceae
 Order Geissolomatales
 Family Geissolomataceae
 Order Cunoniales
 Family Cunoniaceae
 Family Baueraceae
 Family Brunelliaceae
 Family Davidsoniaceae
 Family Eucryphiaceae
 Family Bruniaceae
 Family Grubbiaceae
 Order Saxifragales
 Family Saxifragaceae
 Family Francoaceae
 Family Greyiaceae
 Family Brexiaceae
 Family Grossulariaceae
 Family Iteaceae
 Family Cephalotaceae
 Family Crassulaceae
 Order Droserales
 Family Droseraceae
 Family Lepuropetalaceae
 Family Parnassiaceae
 Order Rosales
 Family Rosaceae
 Family Neuradaceae
 Family Malaceae
 Family Amygdalaceae
 Family Anisophylleaceae
 Family Crossosomataceae
 Family Surianaceae
 Family Rhabdodendraceae
 Order Gunnerales
 Family Gunneraceae
 Superorder Podostemiflorae
 Order Podostemales
 Family Podostemaceae (including Tristichaceae)
 Superorder Fabiflorae
 Order Fabales
 Family Mimosaceae
 Family Caesalpiniaceae
 Family Fabaceae
 Superorder Proteiflorae
 Order Proteales
 Family Proteaceae
 Order Elaeagnales
 Family Elaeagnaceae
 Superorder Myrtiflorae
 Order Myrtales
 Family Psiloxylaceae
 Family Heteropyxidaceae
 Family Myrtaceae
 Family Onagraceae
 Family Trapaceae
 Family Lythraceae
 Family Combretaceae
 Family Melastomataceae
 Family Memecylaceae
 Family Crypteroniaceae
 Family Oliniaceae
 Family Penaeaceae
 Family Rhynchocalycaceae
 Family Alzateaceae
 Order Haloragales
 Family Haloragaceae
 Superorder Rutiflorae 
 Order Sapindales
 Family Coriariaceae
 Family Anacardiaceae
 Family Leitneriaceae
 Family Podoaceae
 Family Sapindaceae
 Family Hippocastanaceae
 Family Aceraceae
 Family Akaniaceae
 Family Bretschneideraceae
 Family Emblingiaceae
 Family Staphyleaceae
 Family Melianthaceae
 Family Sabiaceae
 Family Meliosmaceae
 Family Connaraceae
 Order Rutales
 Family Rutaceae
 Family Ptaeroxylaceae
 Family Cneoraceae
 Family Simaroubaceae
 Family Tepuianthaceae
 Family Burseraceae
 Family Meliaceae
 Order Polygalales
 Family Malpighiaceae
 Family Trigoniaceae
 Family Vochysiaceae
 Family Polygalaceae
 Family Krameriaceae
 Order Geraniales
 Family Zygophyllaceae
 Family Nitrariaceae
 Family Peganaceae
 Family Balanitaceae
 Family Erythroxylaceae
 Family Humiriaceae
 Family Linaceae
 Family Ctenolophonaceae
 Family Ixonanthaceae
 Family Lepidobotryaceae
 Family Oxalidaceae (including Averrhoaceae)
 Family Geraniaceae
 Family Dirachmaceae
 Family Ledocarpaceae
 Family Vivianiaceae
 Family Biebersteiniaceae
 Order Linales (incorporated into Geraniales)
 Family Linaceae
 Family Humiriaceae
 Family Ctenolophonaceae
 Family Ixonanthaceae
 Family Erythroxylaceae
 Family Lepidobotryaceae
 Family Oxalidaceae
 Order Celastrales
 Family Stackhousiaceae
 Family Lophopyxidaceae
 Family Cardiopteridaceae
 Family Corynocarpaceae
 Family Celastraceae
 Order Rhizophorales
 Family Rhizophoraceae
 Family Elaeocarpaceae
 Order Balsaminales
 Family Balsaminaceae
 Superorder Santaliflorae
 Order Santalales
 Family Olacaceae
 Family Opiliaceae
 Family Loranthaceae
 Family Medusandraceae
 Family Misodendraceae
 Family Eremolepidaceae
 Family Santalaceae
 Family Viscaceae
 Superorder Balanophoriflorae
 Order Balanophorales
 Family Cynomoriaceae
 Family Balanophoraceae
 Superorder Araliiflorae
 Order Pittosporales
 Family Pittosporaceae
 Family Tremandraceae
 Family Byblidaceae
 Order Araliales
 Family Araliaceae
 Family Apiaceae
 Superorder Asteriflorae
 Order Campanulales
 Family Pentaphragmataceae
 Family Campanulaceae
 Family Lobeliaceae
 Order Asterales
 Family Asteraceae
 Superorder Solaniflorae
 Order Solanales
 Family Solanaceae
 Family Sclerophylacaceae
 Family Goetzeaceae
 Family Convolvulaceae
 Family Cuscutaceae
 Family Cobaeaceae
 Family Polemoniaceae
 Order Boraginales
 Family Hydrophyllaceae
 Family Ehretiaceae
 Family Boraginaceae
 Family Lennoaceae
 Family Hoplestigmataceae
 Superorder Corniflorae
 Order Fouquieriales
 Family Fouquieriaceae
 Order Ericales
 Family Actinidiaceae
 Family Clethraceae
 Family Cyrillaceae
 Family Ericaceae
 Family Empetraceae
 Family Monotropaceae
 Family Pyrolaceae
 Family Epacridaceae
 Order Eucommiales
 Family Eucommiaceae
 Order Sarraceniales
 Family Sarraceniaceae
 Order Cornales
 Family Garryaceae
 Family Alangiaceae
 Family Nyssaceae
 Family Cornaceae
 Family Roridulaceae
 Family Davidiaceae
 Family Escalloniaceae
 Family Helwingiaceae
 Family Torricelliaceae
 Family Aucubaceae
 Family Aralidiaceae
 Family Diapensiaceae
 Family Phellinaceae
 Family Aquifoliaceae
 Family Paracryphiaceae
 Family Sphenostemonaceae
 Family Symplocaceae
 Family Icacinaceae
 Family Montiniaceae
 Family Columelliaceae
 Family Stylidiaceae (including Donatiaceae)
 Family Alseuosmiaceae
 Family Hydrangeaceae
 Family Sambucaceae
 Family Viburnaceae
 Family Menyanthaceae
 Family Adoxaceae
 Family Phyllonomaceae
 Family Tribelaceae
 Family Eremosynaceae
 Family Pterostemonaceae
 Family Tetracarpaeaceae
 Order Dipsacales
 Family Caprifoliaceae
 Family Valerianaceae
 Family Dipsacaceae
 Family Morinaceae
 Family Calyceraceae
 Superorder Loasiflorae
 Order Loasales
 Family Loasaceae
 Superorder Gentianiflorae
 Order Goodeniales
 Family Goodeniaceae
 Order Oleales
 Family Oleaceae
 Order Gentianales
 Family Desfontainiaceae
 Family Loganiaceae
 Family Dialypetalanthaceae
 Family Rubiaceae
 Family Theligonaceae
 Family Gentianaceae
 Family Saccifoliaceae
 Family Apocynaceae
 Family Asclepiadaceae
 Superorder Lamiiflorae
 Order Lamiales
 Family Retziaceae
 Family Stilbaceae
 Family Buddlejaceae
 Family Scrophulariaceae
 Family Myoporaceae
 Family Globulariaceae
 Family Plantaginaceae
 Family Lentibulariaceae
 Family Pedaliaceae
 Family Trapellaceae
 Family Martyniaceae
 Family Gesneriaceae
 Family Bignoniaceae
 Family Acanthaceae
 Family Verbenaceae
 Family Lamiaceae
 Family Callitrichaceae
 Order Hydrostachyales
 Family Hydrostachyaceae
 Order Hippuridales
 Family Hippuridaceae

1982 system (monocotyledons)

Summary 
Six superorders
Superorder Alismatiflorae
Superorder Ariflorae
Superorder Liliiflorae
Superorder Zingiberiflorae
Superorder Commeliniflorae
Superorder Areciflorae

Details 
 Superorder Alismatiflorae 5 orders
 Superorder Ariflorae 1 order
 Order Arales
 Superorder Liliiflorae 11 orders
 Order Dioscoreales
 Order Taccales
 Order Asparagales
 Family Smilacaceae
 Family Petermanniaceae
 Family Philesiaceae
 Family Convallariaceae
 Family Asparagaceae
 Family Herreriaceae
 Family Dracaenaceae
 Family Doryanthaceae
 Family Dasypogonaceae
 Family Phormiaceae
 Family Xanthorrhoeaceae
 Family Agavaceae
 Family Hypoxidaceae
 Family Asphodelaceae
 Family Aphyllanthaceae
 Family Dianellaceae
 Family Tecophilaeaceae
 Family Cyanastraceae
 Family Eriospermaceae
 Family Hemerocallidaceae
 Family Funkiaceae
 Family Hyacinthaceae
 Family Alliaceae
 Family Amaryllidaceae
 Order Liliales
 Family Iridaceae
 Family Geosiridaceae
 Family Colchicaceae
 Family Alstroemeriaceae
 Family Tricyrtidaceae
 Family Calochortaceae
 Family Liliaceae
 Family Melanthiaceae
 Order Burmanniales
 Order Orchidales
 Order Pontederiales
 Order Haemodorales
 Order Philydrales
 Order Velloziales
 Order Bromeliales
 Superorder Zingiberiflorae 1 order
 Order Zingiberales
 Superorder Commeliniflorae 8 orders
 Superorder Areciflorae 3 orders

1985 system (monocotyledons)

Summary 
Ten superorders
Superorder Liliiflorae
Superorder Ariflorae
Superorder Triuridiflorae
Superorder Alismatiflorae
Superorder Bromeliiflorae
Superorder Zingiberiflorae
Superorder Commeliniflorae
Superorder Cyclanthiflorae
Superorder Areciflorae
Superorder Pandaniflorae

Details

Liliiflorae 
 Superorder Liliiflorae 6 orders p. 107
 Order Dioscoreales
 Family Trichopodaceae
 Family Dioscoreaceae
 Family Taccaceae
 Family Stemonaceae
 Family Trilliaceae
 Family Smilacaceae
 Family Petermanniaceae
 Order Asparagales
 Family Philesiaceae
 Family Luzuriagaceae
 Family Convallariaceae
 Family Asparagaceae
 Family Ruscaceae
 Family Herreriaceae
 Family Dracaenaceae
 Family Nolinaceae
 Family Asteliaceae
 Family Hanguanaceae
 Family Dasypogonaceae
 Family Calectasiaceae
 Family Blandfordiaceae
 Family Xanthorrhoeaceae
 Family Agavaceae
 Family Hypoxidaceae
 Family Tecophilaeaceae
 Family Cyanastraceae
 Family Eriospermaceae
 Family Ixioliriaceae
 Family Phormiaceae
 Family Doryanthaceae
 Family Hemerocallidaceae
 Family Asphodelaceae
 Family Anthericaceae
 Family Aphyllanthaceae
 Family Funkiaceae
 Family Hyacinthaceae
 Family Alliaceae
 Family Amaryllidaceae
 Tribe Amaryllideae
 Tribe Hippeastrae
 Tribe Lycoridae
 Tribe Stenomesseae
 Tribe Eucharideae
 Tribe Pancratieae
 Tribe Narcisseae
 Tribe Galantheae
 Order Melanthiales
 Family Melanthiaceae
 Family Campynemaceae
 Order Burmanniales
 Family Burmanniaceae
 Family Thismiaceae
 Family Corsiaceae
 Order Liliales
 Family Alstroemeriaceae
 Family Colchicaceae
 Family Uvulariaceae
 Family Calochortaceae
 Family Liliaceae
 Family Geosiridaceae
 Family Iridaceae
 Order Orchids
 Family Apostasiaceae
 Family Cypripediaceae
 Family Orchidaceae

Ariflorae 
 Superorder Ariflorae 1 order p. 275
 Order Arales
 Family Araceae
 Family Lemnaceae

Triuridiflorae 
 Superorder Triuridiflorae 1 order p. 287
 Order Triuridales
 Family Triuridaceae

Alismatiflorae 
 Superorder Alismatiflorae 2 orders p. 292
 Order Alismatales
 Family Aponogetonaceae
 Family Butomaceae
 Family Limnocharitaceae
 Family Alismataceae
 Family Hydrocharitaceae
 Order Najadales
 Family Scheuchzeriaceae
 Family Juncaginaceae
 Family Potamogetonaceae
 Family Posidoniaceae
 Family Zosteraceae
 Family Zannichelliaceae
 Family Cymodoceaceae
 Family Najadaceae

Bromeliiflorae 
 Superorder Bromeliflorae 6 orders p. 323
 Order Velloziales
 Family Velloziaceae
 Order Bromeliales
 Family Bromeliaceae
 Order Philydrales
 Family Philydraceae
 Order Haemodorales
 Family Haemodoraceae
 Order Pontederiales
 Family Pontederiaceae
 Order Typhales
 Family Sparganiaceae
 Family Typhaceae

Zingiberiflorae 
 Superorder Zingiberiflorae 1 order p. 350
 Order Zingiberales
 Family Lowiaceae
 Family Musaceae
 Family Heliconiaceae
 Family Strelitziaceae
 Family Zingiberaceae
 Family Costaceae
 Family Cannaceae
 Family Marantaceae

Commeliniflorae 
 Superorder Commeliniflorae 4 orders p. 374
 Order Commelinales
 Family Commelinaceae
 Family Mayacaceae
 Family Xyridaceae
 Family Rapateaceae
 Family Eriocaulaceae
 Order Hydatellales
 Family Hydatellaceae
 Order Cyperales
 Family Juncaceae
 Family Thurniaceae
 Family Cyperaceae
 Order Poales
 Family Flagellariaceae
 Family Joinvilleaceae
 Family Poaceae
 Family Ecdeiocolaceae
 Family Anarthriaceae
 Family Restionaceae
 Family Centrolepidaceae

Cyclanthiflorae 
 Superorder Cyclanthiflorae 1 order p. 461
 Order Cyclanthales
 Family Cyclanthaceae

Areciflorae 
 Superorder Areciflorae 1 order p. 467
 Order Arecales
 Family Arecaceae

Pandaniflorae 
 Superorder Pandaniflorae  1 order p. 480
 Order Pandanales
 Family Pandanaceae

Notes

References

Bibliography 

 
 
 , in 
 
 
 
   Additional excerpts

system, Dahlgren